Luca De Carlo (born 7 August 1972) is an Italian politician.

Political career 
He was elected to the Italian Senate in a by-election in Villafranca di Verona held in September 2020 to succeed Stefano Bertacco who died in June. De Carlo is the first parliamentarian in the history of Italy to have been elected to both the Chamber and the Senate during the same legislature.

Electoral history

References 

Living people
1972 births
Politicians from the Province of Verona
Deputies of Legislature XVIII of Italy
Senators of Legislature XVIII of Italy
21st-century Italian politicians
Brothers of Italy politicians